Mujhme (Hindi:मुझमे  Urdu:مجھمے) is a Hindi cover of song Malare from the 2015 blockbuster Premam. The original song was composed by Rajesh murugeshan with Lyrics by Shabareesh Varma and vocals by Vijay Yesudas. Hindi lyrics is penned by Shreeraj Kurup and sung by Vibhas Purushu. It quickly became popular 
on social Media upon release.

Legacy
The song was Featured in many leading Newspapers all praising the lyrics of the song 
and the vocals too. It has already got more than 200k views on 
Facebook  is in the run to complete 100K views on YouTube
 as well

References

External links
 
 http://www.deccanchronicle.com/entertainment/mollywood/260516/a-lyrical-love-in-hindi.html
 http://www.mathrubhumi.com/movies-music/news/malare-song-hindi-version-malayalam-news-1.1076239
 http://www.manoramaonline.com/music/music-news/malare-hindi-cover-goes-viral.html
 http://emergingkerala.dcbooks.com/premam-malare-song-in-hindi.html
 http://itsmearundhathinair.blogspot.in/2016/05/malare-hindi-version-cover-by-shreeraj.html

Indian songs
Hindi songs